, commonly written as 大阪ガス, is a Japanese gas company based in Osaka, Japan. It supplies gas to the Kansai region, especially the Keihanshin area when an advert of 1986 used the Mr. Men series by Roger Hargreaves.

Osaka Gas is also engaged in upstream, midstream and downstream energy projects throughout the world, including LNG terminals, pipelines and independent power projects, particularly in Southeast Asia, Australia and North America.

Overview
Service area : 3,220 km²,  68 million households.
Annual gas sales : 8,5 billion m³.
Pipeline : 56,500km in Japan.
The company owns upstream oil and gas assets in Norway and Australia, including Gorgon LNG, Sunrise LNG and Crux projects in Australia  and Qalhat LNG in Oman.
It also owns pipeline and power assets internationally.

History 
Osaka Gas began operations in 1897 in Nishi-ku, Osaka, on a site now occupied by the Dome City Gas Building near the Kyocera Dome. It expanded to Wakayama in 1911. Following the end of World War II, in October 1945, Osaka Gas merged with 14 other gas companies in the Kansai region, expanding its footprint to cover Kobe and Kyoto.

Osaka Gas entered its first overseas upstream LNG project in Brunei in 1972, followed by investments in Indonesia in 1977 and Australia in 1989.

Affiliates
Osaka Gas Australia Pty Ltd 
Osaka Gas Engineering Company Limited
Osaka Gas Chemical Company Limited
Senboku Power Fuel Company Limited
Osaka Gas Energy America

References

Omni Escapes Magazine Escapes Magazine Summer 2018

External links

 Osaka Gas Official Website
 Acquisition of Interest in Qalhat LNG Project
 Acquisition of Interest in Crux project in Australia
 Australian Pipe & Power Business
 Participation in Gorgon LNG Project
 Participation in Hallet 4 Wind Farm project
 Gorgon project

Natural gas companies of Japan
Energy companies established in 1897
Japanese companies established in 1897
Companies based in Osaka Prefecture
Companies listed on the Osaka Exchange
Nomura Holdings